This list of pre-20th century submarines includes those pioneering submarines constructed prior to the turn of the 20th century, which marks the point when the submarine became a viable weapon of war. This saw the advent of such vessels as the American  and the French Narval, which set the pattern for submarine design for much of the 20th century.

List

See also

List of submarines of the United States Navy
List of submarines of the Royal Navy

References

19th-century submarines
Lists of submarines